The Division of Fenner is an Australian Electoral Division in the Australian Capital Territory and the Jervis Bay Territory. As of the 2018 redistribution, it includes Gungahlin and the part of Belconnen north of Belconnen Way and west of Eastern Valley Way, Aikman Drive and William Slim Drive (the suburbs of Belconnen, Charnwood, Dunlop, Evatt, Florey, Flynn, Fraser, Higgins, Holt, Latham, Macgregor, Macnamara, McKellar, Melba, Page, Scullin, Spence and Strathnairn). It also includes the Jervis Bay Territory.

Geography
Federal electoral division boundaries in Australia are determined at redistributions by a redistribution committee appointed by the Australian Electoral Commission. Redistributions occur for the boundaries of divisions in a particular state or territory, and they occur every seven years, or sooner if a state or territory's representation entitlement changes or when divisions of a state or territory are malapportioned.

History

Fenner replaced the abolished Division of Fraser from 2016. Fraser was always a safe seat for the Australian Labor Party.

The Australian Electoral Commission decided that, with effect from the 2016 election, the former Division of Fraser would be changed to the Division of Fenner, to honour scientist Frank Fenner. The name change was due to plans by the AEC to name a seat in Victoria after former prime minister Malcolm Fraser. The proposed name change met with opposition from a number of ACT residents. For instance, former ACT Chief Minister Jon Stanhope said that the name change "traduces" the legacy of Jim Fraser, the MP for Division of Australian Capital Territory from 1951 to 1970 and a man "close to the heart of Canberrans." He also claimed that Fenner himself would have objected to the proposal.

Fenner originally included the land in the ACT north of the Molonglo River and Lake Burley Griffin, including the districts of Belconnen, Gungahlin, North Canberra, except Civic, Acton, Turner south of Haig Park and east of Sullivans Creek, Braddon south of Haig Park, Reid, Campbell and Pialligo.

At the 2018 redistribution, it lost all of its territory in North Canberra, the rural districts of Majura and Kowen and the Belconnen suburbs of Aranda, Bruce, Cook, Giralang, Hawker, Kaleen, Lawson, Macquarie and Weetangera to Canberra.

Members

Election results

References

External links
 Division of Fenner – Australian Electoral Commission

Electoral divisions of Australia
Constituencies established in 2016
2016 establishments in Australia